The Department of Housing and Regional Development was an Australian government department that existed between March 1994 and March 1996.

History
The department was created by the Keating Government on 25 March 1994, dividing the Department of Human Services and Health. At the time, media noted that the department was similar to the Whitlam-era Department of Urban and Regional Development, with the key difference being that all funds were to be paid through states and local governments rather than through Australian Government programs.

After the Howard Government was elected at the 1996 federal election, Prime Minister John Howard dismantled the department, assigning its welfare housing functions to the Department of Social Security and its industry functions to the newly created Department of Industry, Science and Tourism.

Scope
Information about the department's functions and/or government funding allocation could be found in the Administrative Arrangements Orders, the annual Portfolio Budget Statements and in the Department's annual reports.

According to the Administrative Arrangements Order (AAO) made on 25 March 1994, the Department dealt with:
Housing
Matters relating to local government
Planning and land management in the Australian Capital Territory
Regional development

Structure
The Department was administered by Australian public servants who were responsible to the Minister for Housing and Regional Development, Brian Howe.

The Secretary of the Department was Andrew Podger.

References

Ministries established in 1994
Housing
1994 establishments in Australia
1996 disestablishments in Australia
Government agencies disestablished in 1996